The Bee Line Railroad is a short-line railroad operated by the Kankakee, Beaverville and Southern Railroad, serving agricultural communities in northwestern Warren County and southwestern Benton County in Indiana, USA. It joins the Kankakee, Beaverville and Southern Railroad about two miles east of Ambia in Benton County, from which point it heads south into Warren, passes through the town of Tab, and terminates just south of Stewart.

External links 

 Stewart Grain Company
 Kankakee, Beaverville & Southern Railroad

References 
 Warren County Historical Society (2002), A History of Warren County, Indiana (175th Anniversary Edition)
 Illini Rail: Kankakee, Beaverville & Southern Railroad history

Indiana railroads
Transportation in Benton County, Indiana
Transportation in Warren County, Indiana
Spin-offs of Conrail
Non-operating common carrier freight railroads in the United States